is a public senior high school in Kanagawa-ku, Yokohama. It is a part of the Kanagawa Prefectural Board of Education.

It has special provisions for non-Japanese students, as it accepts the Zaiken Gaikokujin-tō Tokubetsu Boshū (在県外国人等特別募集).

References

External links
  Kanagawa Sohgoh High School

High schools in Yokohama